The Promise is a jazz album released in 1995 by John McLaughlin on Verve Records. The album peaked number 4 in the Billboard Top Jazz Albums chart 1996.

Track listing
All tracks composed by John McLaughlin; except where indicated
 "Django" (John Lewis) – 7:24 			
 "Thelonius Melodius" – 5:22 			
 "Amy and Joseph" – 2:28 			
 "No Return" – 7:20 			
 "El Ciego" – 9:10 			
 "Jazz Jungle" – 14:45 			
 "The Wish" – 8:39 			
 "English Jam" (Vinnie Colaiuta, John McLaughlin, Sting) – 1:12 			
 "Tokyo Decadence" – 0:39 			
 "Shin Jin Rui" – 10:47 			
 "The Peacocks" (Jimmy Rowles) – 5:53

Personnel
Musicians
 Don Alias – percussion
 Jim Beard – keyboards
 Dennis Chambers – drums
 Vinnie Colaiuta – drums
 James Genus –  bass guitar
 Zakir Hussain – tabla
 Nishat Khan – sitar, vocals
 Yan Maresz – arranger, acoustic bass guitar, bass guitar
 John McLaughlin – acoustic guitar, electric guitar, keyboards, MIDI guitar
 Mark Mondesir – drums
 Pino Palladino – bass
 Mariko Takahashi – vocals

Guest Artists

 Jeff Beck – electric guitar (track 1)
 Michael Brecker – tenor sax (track 6)
 Joey DeFrancesco – Hammond organ, trumpet (track 4)
 Al Di Meola – acoustic guitar (track 5)
 Trilok Gurtu – percussion (track 7)
 Tony Hymas – keyboards (track 1)
 Paco de Lucía – acoustic guitar (track 5)
 David Sanborn – alto sax (track 10)
 Sting – bass (track 8)

Production staff
 Jean-Philippe Allard – executive producer
 René Ameline – engineer
 Philippe Arnal – assistant engineer
 Adam Blackburn – assistant engineer
 Steve Cook – assistant engineer
 Max Costa – arranger, engineer, mixing
 Gustav Hobel – engineer
 Sven Hoffman – assistant engineer
 Ken Jones – engineer
 Eddie Kramer – engineer, producer
 Alberto Mayer – cover design
 John McLaughlin – assistant engineer, mixing, producer
 Simon Osborne – assistant engineer
 Maurice Ouazana – engineer
 Christian Pégand – production coordination
 Ed Rak  – engineer
 Christian Rose – photography

Critical reception

Allmusic gave it four stars and reviewer Thom Jurek states "Ultimately, The Promise stands as one of McLaughlin's towering achievements as a guitarist and leader." Walter Koslosky in his AllAboutJazz review classifies The Promise "a potpourri of musical styles and performers. Yet, despite its disparate compositions and styles, the record manages to be a cohesive work of art. ... Bravo!"

Chart performance

References

1995 albums
John McLaughlin (musician) albums
Albums produced by Eddie Kramer
Verve Records albums